Garry Edwin Jones (11 December 1950 – 6 April 2016) was an English footballer who played as a centre forward.

In 1965, at the age of 15, he was known locally for playing for the Manchester schoolboys.

Spending most of his career (1968–1975) at Bolton Wanderers, playing 236 games and scoring 55 goals, he also had spells at Sheffield United, Los Angeles Aztecs, Blackpool, Hereford United, and Runcorn.

On 5 October 1971, he scored all three goals in Bolton's victory over Manchester City in the League Cup.

Personal life
Jones lived in Bramhall, Cheshire, he has three children and 8 grandchildren. He died on 6 April 2016.

Honours

Bolton Wanderers
 Football League Third Division champions: 1972–73
Runcorn
 Alliance Premier League champions: 1981–82

References

1950 births
2016 deaths
People from Wythenshawe
English footballers
Association football forwards
Bolton Wanderers F.C. players
Sheffield United F.C. players
Los Angeles Aztecs players
Blackpool F.C. players
Northwich Victoria F.C. players
Hereford United F.C. players
Runcorn F.C. Halton players
Chorley F.C. players
Derry City F.C. players
English Football League players
North American Soccer League (1968–1984) players
National League (English football) players
League of Ireland players
English expatriate sportspeople in the United States
Expatriate soccer players in the United States
English expatriate footballers